Stay the Night is a 1992 American television crime-drama mini-series directed  by Harry Winer and starring Barbara Hershey.

Plot 
Michael Kettman Jr. is a small town teenage boy, who has a scandalous romantic affair with Jimmie Sue Finger, an older, married woman. Jimmie Sue is in an abusive marriage, and she and Michael plot to murder her husband, which will lead to either eternal bliss for the both of them or a curse on their relationship.

Cast 

 Barbara Hershey as Jimmie Sue Finger 
 Jane Alexander as Blanche Kettman
 Morgan Weisser as Michael Kettman Jr.
 Fred Dalton Thompson as Det. Malone
 Doran Clark as Roxanne Kettman
 Heather Fairfield as Donna
 Melissa Clayton as Sally
 Matthew Posey as D.A. Tom Charron
 Tommy Hollis as Det. Clark
 Earl Hindman as Mike Kettman Sr.
 Judith Jones as Angela Finger
 Scott Brian Higgs as Terry Finger 
 Jeff Rose as Tommy
 Eric Ware as Ardis Jones
 Maceo Walker as Swivel
 Tom Nowicki as Jim Berry
 Walton Goggins as Wayne Seagrove

References

External links 

1992 television films
1992 films
American television films
Films directed by Harry Winer
1992 crime films
American crime films
1990s English-language films
1990s American films